Eldorado Dry Lake is a playa in the Eldorado Valley in Clark County, Nevada.  It lies at an elevation of 1,708 feet at the bottom of the basin of Eldorado Valley.

References

Eldorado Dry Lake
Valleys of Nevada